Coleophora persimplexella is a moth of the family Coleophoridae. It is found in Canada, including Nova Scotia.

The larvae feed on the leaves of Comptonia, Betula and Alnus species. They create a lobe case.

References

persimplexella
Moths of North America
Moths described in 1955